Button, button, who's got the button is a game of ingenuity where players form a circle with their hands out, palms together. One child, called the leader or 'it', takes an object such as a button and goes around the circle, with  their hands in everybody else's hands one by one. In one person's hands they drop the button, though they continue to put their hands in the others' so that no one knows where the button is except for the giver and receiver.

The leader, or all the children in the circle, says "Button, button, who's got the button?" and then each child in the circle guesses. The child guessing replies with their choice, e.g. "Billy has the button!"

Once the child with the button is finally guessed, that child is the one to distribute the button and start a new round.

Alternate versions

Passing
A second similar version has the child who is "it" stand in the center of the circle. The button is then passed behind the backs of the children in the circle, stopping at random. "It" tries to guess where the button is and once the button is found takes his or her place in the circle. Whoever had the button then becomes the new "it" and play begins again.

Questions
A slight variation on the first two versions has "it" ask questions (like in the game Twenty Questions) to determine who has the button.

Staircase
Another version is usually played by several children with one adult. The game's origin is unknown, but it existed before 1900. The children start by sitting on the bottom stair of a staircase. The adult holds out both fists, one holding a button. The adult asks, "Button, button, who's got the button?" Whoever guesses correctly advances one step. The first one to reach the top step wins the game. If the staircase is not wide enough, the children can be divided up into teams.

In popular culture

 In Little Men, by Louisa May Alcott in 1871, the children of Plumfield reference playing "Button, button, who's got the button?"
 The game is often employed to mean playing with the facts or games with the police, in detective stories by Erle Stanley Gardner. 
 In Go Ask Alice, the kids at the party play button, button, who's got the button, where the "button" is an LSD-spiked can of soda. The diarist gets the spiked can of soda, which leads to her subsequent drug binge.
 The game is referenced in the noir films Murder, My Sweet (1944) when Philip Marlowe (played by Dick Powell) says, "recently I've been playing Button Button with the cops", and The Naked City (1948) ("And now he's [Detective Jimmy Halloran] playing button, button in a city of eight million people.")
 Perry Mason - In "The Case of the Gilded Lily" (1958) Anne Rowan Brent (Mari Aldon) says to motel night manager Harry Mitchell (Wally Brown), "Its button, button, who's got the button and I don't need any partners to play"!
 The game is referenced by the title character in the movie Willy Wonka & the Chocolate Factory.
 In the Walt Disney version of Alice in Wonderland, during their first meeting Tweedle Dee and Tweedle Dum ask Alice if they should play this game.
 In the Robert Frost poem "The Witch of Coos," the game is referenced in lines 7-8: "Summoning spirits isn't 'Button, button, who's got the button,' I would have them know."
In season 7 of Buffy the Vampire Slayer, an insane Spike says "Button, button, who's got the button? My money's on the witch," when he is rambling.
 In Sid & Marty Kroft's popular children's show H. R. Pufnstuf (1969) the game is mentioned by the mayor when looking for buttons as a form of payment.
 In a season 2 episode of Dexter's Laboratory, Dee Dee says "Button button, who's got the button?" before pressing a red button to take off in a hovercraft.
 In a radio episode of Father Knows Best, Mr. Grible asks Jim if he's interrupting anything and Jim jokingly said, "No...we were just playing a game Button Button, Who's Got the Button." 
In Andromeda season 1 episode 15 Trance Gemini says "button button, who's got the button" while playing with a small metal coin.
 In Lost in Space, season 2, "The Curse of Cousin Smith", Professor Robinson and Major West walk up on Cousin Smith performing the three cups and a ball trick. Major West says, "Looks like the colonel is playing that old childhood game, button, button, who's got the button?"
 On page 359 of the book The Magicians by Lev Grossman, the character of the Beast asks Quentin and his friends, "Button, button, who's got the button? Who's got it?"
 The title of the Twilight Zone episode "Button, Button" is a reference to the game.

Guessing games
Children's games
Buttons